The America First Secretary of State Coalition ("America First SOS Coalition") was an American right-wing coalition formed to support a slate of candidates in the 2022 United States secretary of state elections. The coalition's president was Jim Marchant, the unsuccessful Republican nominee for Secretary of State of Nevada, and was headquartered in Las Vegas.

Candidates supported by the coalition had advocated former President Donald Trump's baseless claims that the 2020 election was stolen. The coalition had endorsed 14 candidates for state secretary of state, as well as Pennsylvania gubernatorial candidate Doug Mastriano, Arizona gubernatorial candidate Kari Lake, and Ohio congressional candidate Dante Sabatucci. The coalition was financially supported by the affiliated Conservatives for Election Integrity PAC (CFEI PAC). Out of the 17 total candidates the coalition endorsed, only 7 candidates advanced past the Republican Party primaries, and only one candidate, Diego Morales, was elected in the 2022 elections.

History and foundation 
The existence of the coalition was first disclosed by Marchant during a conversation on Steve Bannon's podcast, War Room. Marchant had been described as the leading organizer of the coalition. 

The coalition reportedly formed following a meeting in May 2021 involving Marchant, QAnon conspiracy theorist Wayne Willott, and other conservative activists and fundraisers. Mike Lindell, founder and CEO of My Pillow, Inc., was reportedly a backer of the coalition.

Initial candidates supported by the coalition included Mark Finchem (Arizona), Kristina Karamo (Michigan), and Jody Hice (Georgia), each of whom had been endorsed by former President Donald Trump. As of February 2022, Marchant was working to recruit candidates running for secretary of state in both Wisconsin and Minnesota.

Conservatives for Election Integrity PAC (CFEI PAC) 
An affiliated political action committee (PAC), the Conservat­ives for Elec­tion Integ­rity PAC (CFEI PAC), was founded by Marchant with the goal of fundraising for candidates for secretary of state. According to the Brennan Center, the PAC has raised $110,000 as of May 2022. The America Project, founded by former Overstock.com CEO Patrick M. Byrne, was a prominent contributor to the PAC.

Policy goals and support 
According to The New York Times, the coalition supported eliminating alleged voter fraud through "eliminating mail-in ballots, requiring single-day voting and committing to 'aggressive voter roll cleanup,' measures that critics had suggested would suppress thousands of Democratic votes."

Candidates 

The following is a list of candidates from the America First SOS website.

See also 

 2022 United States secretary of state elections
 America First (policy)
 Attempts to overturn the 2020 United States presidential election
 QAnon

Notes

References 

Conservative organizations in the United States
QAnon
Organizations established in 2021